Skirwith Abbey is a country house in Skirwith, Cumbria, England. The House is a two-storey house of five by three bays, built by Thomas Addison, mason, in 1768-74 for John Orfeur Yates, who spent many years in India.  The main front has more closely spaced windows in the centre; and the centre and angles are also defined by differences in the ashlar stonework.  The front door is approached by a splayed, balustraded staircase carried on a bridge over the wide area that encircles the house.  The rear of the house is similar, and both sides have a canted full-height bay window in the centre.  Except on the entrance front, the area is surrounded by cast iron railings with obelisk standards.

References
C. R. Hudleston & R. S. Boumphrey, Cumberland Families and Heraldry, 1978, p. 378
Sir N. Pevsner, The Buildings of England: Cumberland and Westmorland, 1967, p. 190
J. M. Robinson, The Country Houses of the North West, 1991, p. 139

External links
 

Country houses in Cumbria
Culgaith